Perrotia is a genus of skippers in the family Hesperiidae.

Species
Perrotia albiplaga Oberthür, 1916
Perrotia eximia (Oberthür, 1923)
Perrotia flora (Oberthür, 1923)
Perrotia gillias (Mabille, 1878)
Perrotia howa (Mabille, 1876)
Perrotia ismael (Oberthür, 1916)
Perrotia kingdoni (Butler, 1879)
Perrotia malchus (Mabille, 1879)
Perrotia ochracea (Evans, 1937)
Perrotia paroechus (Mabille, [1887])
Perrotia silvestralis (Viette, 1956)
Perrotia sylvia (Evans, 1937)
Perrotia varians (Oberthür, 1916)

References

External links
Natural History Museum Lepidoptera genus database

Erionotini
Hesperiidae genera